The Gnishik Formation is a geologic formation in Armenia, Azerbaijan and Iran. It preserves fossils dated to the Wordian age of the Permian period.

The sediments were deposited in an open marine setting at the northern edge of the Paleo-Tethys Ocean.

The coral Wentzellophyllum gnishikense was named after the formation.

Description 
The Gnishik Formation was first formally described by Arakelyan in 1964, based on a section in the Gnishik River valley, after which the formation was named. The formation is mostly represented by thin-bedded, occasionally shaly, dark grey and black bituminous foraminiferal-algal biodetrital limestones. The occasional admixture of clayey and terrigenous material colors the limestones light grey and yellowish. The thin-bedded layers alternate with coarser-bedded compact varieties.

In Iran, the formation overlies the Dorud Formation and is overlain by the Khachik Formation, while in Armenia the formation rests on top of the Asni Formation and is overlain by the Arpa Formation. The Gnishik Formation represents an increase in subsidence rate in the Permian. The sediments were deposited at the northern edge of the Paleo-Tethys Ocean.

The formation is dated to the late Murgabian, which belongs to the Wordian stage of the Middle Permian. The Gnishik Formation is correlated with the Ruteh and Nesen Formations, and the Kuffengian stage of Chinese chronostratigraphy.

Fossil content 
Among many others, the following fossils have been reported from the formation:

Invertebrates 
Trilobites
 Pseudophillipsia armenica
 Pseudophillipsia (Carniphillipsia) paffenholzi
 Acropyge sp.
Cephalopods
 Orthocerida indet.
Gastropods
 Pharkidonotus khairliensis
 Naticopsis cf. spectatus
 Bellerophon sp.
 Naticopsis sp.
 Straparollus sp.
 ?Euphemites sp.
 ?Platyceras sp.
 Bellerophontidae indet.
Corals
 Ipciphyllum araxense
 I. flexuosum
 I. originale
 I. ex gr. restriseptatum
 I. simplex
 I. subtimoricum
 I. subelegans
 Lonsdaleia aff. gracilis
 L. aff. jenningsi
 Lophocarinophyllum lophophyllidum
 L. pulchrum
 L. aff. zaphrentoideum
 Michelinia vesiculosa
 Paraipciphyllum transcaucasicum
 Parawentzelella (Parawentzelella) canalifera
 Pentaphyllum leptoconicum
 Praetachylasma alternatum
 Protomichelinia microstoma
 Sinopora asiatica
 Szechuanophyllum szechuanense
 Ufimia elongata
 Wentzelella armenica
 Wentzelella (Wentzelella) densicolumnata
 Wentzellophyllum gnishikense
 W. parvus
 W. volzi
 Yatsengia asiatica
 Lophophyllidium sp.
 Wentzelella sp.
Crinoids
 ?Poteriocrinites ardjichensis
Rhynchonellata
 Cryptospirifer omeishanensis
 Septospirigerella baissalensis
 Terebratuloidea davidsoni
 Crenispirifer sp.
 Septospirigerella sp.
Strophomenata
 Chonostegoides baissalensis
 C. ogbinensis
 Edriosteges poyangensis
 Leptodus sp.
Stenolaemata
 Mackinneyella dzhulfensis 
 Rhabdomeson floriferum
 Septopora lineata
Fusulinina
 Sichotenella cf. sutschanica
 Yangchienia cf. haydeni
 Nankinella cf. ovata
 N. orbicularia
 Staffella sphaerica
 S. suborientalis
 Eoverbeekina cf. intermedia
 Pisolina abichi
 P. subsphaerica
 Leella ex gr. bellula
 Sphaerulina crassispira
 S. ogbinensis
 Verbeekina cf. heimi
 V. verbeeki
 Eopolydiexodina darwasica
 E. persica
 Polydiexodina chekiangensis
 Chusenella abichi
 C. doraschamensis
 Dunbarula sp.
Foraminifera
 Globigaetania angulata

Flora 
Dasycladophyceae
 Atractyliopsis fecundus
 Diplopora americana
 Endoina stellata
 Epimastopora nipponica
 Gyroporella tenuimarginata
 Johnsonia spinosa
 Macroporella spinosa
 Mizzia velebitana
 Pseudogyroporella grandis
 Pseudovermiporella serbica
 Stolleyella yabei

Rhodophyceae
 Succodium ambiguum
 S. difficile
 Gymnocodium bellerophonte
 G. novum
 Permocalculus forospinus
 P. fragilis
 P. piai
 Ungdarella stellata

See also 

 List of fossiliferous stratigraphic units in Armenia
 List of fossiliferous stratigraphic units in Azerbaijan
 Geology of Armenia
 Geology of Azerbaijan
 Geology of Iran

References

Bibliography 
Geology
 
  

Paleontology

  
 
 
 
 
 
 
 
 
 

Geologic formations of Armenia
Geologic formations of Azerbaijan
Geologic formations of Iran
Permian System of Asia
Permian Armenia
Permian Azerbaijan
Permian Iran
Wordian
Limestone formations
Open marine deposits
Permian southern paleotropical deposits
Paleontology in Armenia
Paleontology in Azerbaijan
Paleontology in Iran